The 12th TVyNovelas Awards, is an Academy of special awards to the best of soap operas and TV shows. The awards ceremony took place on April 29, 1994 in the México D.F. The ceremony was televised in the Mexico by Canal de las estrellas.

Raúl Velasco hosted the show. Corazón salvaje won 7 awards including Best Telenovela of the Year, the most for the evening. Other winners Los Parientes Pobres and Dos mujeres, un camino won 2 awards and Capricho, and Entre la vida y la muerte won one each.

Summary of awards and nominations

Winners and nominees

Novelas

Others

Special Awards 
 Artistic Career: Angélica María
 Film Career: Luis Aguilar
 Recognition of the Best Entertainment Program: Primer Impacto

International Segment 
This segment is transmitted only in the United States for Univisión:
 Most Successful Telenovela: Corazón salvaje
 Second Most Successful Telenovela: Los Parientes Pobres

Missing 
People who did not attend ceremony wing and were nominated in the shortlist in each category:
 Alicia Montoya
 Arcelia Ramírez
 Edith González
 Humberto Elizondo
 Itatí Cantoral
 Joaquin Cordero
 María Teresa Rivas
 Victoria Ruffo

References 

TVyNovelas Awards
TVyNovelas Awards
TVyNovelas Awards
TVyNovelas Awards ceremonies